Leonard "Len" Dudkowski is a retired American soccer player.  He played professionally in the North American Soccer League and American Soccer League.

Dudkowski attended Harris Teachers College where he played on the men's soccer team.  In 1974, he turned professional with the Cincinnati Comets of the American Soccer League.  In 1975, he moved up to the Boston Minutemen of the North American Soccer League.  In 1976, he played for the Tacoma Tides of the American Soccer League. He may have played on loan to the Tides from the St. Louis Stars.  In 1977, he played for the Stars.

References

External links
 NASL stats

American soccer players
American Soccer League (1933–1983) players
Boston Minutemen players
Cincinnati Comets players
North American Soccer League (1968–1984) players
St. Louis Stars (soccer) players
Tacoma Tides players
Living people
Year of birth missing (living people)
Association football defenders
Association football forwards
Harris–Stowe State University alumni
College men's soccer players in the United States